Mathew James (born 7 April 1974 in Essendon, Victoria) is a former Australian rules football field umpire most notably in the Australian Football League (AFL).

Umpiring career
James began umpiring in 1991 with the Footscray District Football League. In 1994 joined the Victorian Football League (VFL) where he umpired until joining the AFL in 1999.

AFL
His debut AFL match was in Round 1 of the 1999 AFL season between Collingwood and Hawthorn.

In 2001, his third year on the AFL umpire panel, he umpired his first AFL Grand Final. He also umpired the 2002 and 2004 AFL Grand Finals. James was also named the All-Australian Umpire in 2004.

International rules
He was the Australian referee in two Test matches in the 2005 International Rules Series between Australia and Ireland.

Retirement
In May 2010 he announced his retirement from umpiring after a persistent calf injury prevented him from umpiring in 2010.  He had umpired 206 AFL games, including 16 finals.

References

Australian Football League umpires
Living people
1974 births
People from Essendon, Victoria
Sportspeople from Melbourne